Laura Aurora Flores Heras (born August 23, 1963) is a Mexican actress, hostess and singer.

Biography
Laura Flores had a hit single "El Alma No Tiene Color" ("The Soul Has No Color"), which was a duet with Marco Antonio Solís taken from the album Me Quede Vacía which received a Gold album certificacion in Mexico. Solís also produced her album Nunca Hagas Lloras a Una Mujer (1995) which had four successful singles: "Antes de Que Te Vayas", "Porque Sé Que Me Mientes", the title track, and the Grupo Mojado cover "Te Felicito". which received airplay on the grupera charts in Mexico. Her first taste of stardom came when she joined Hermanos y Amigos, whose band members were her family. The group carried out extensive tours in Mexico, the Netherlands, Germany and Spain for almost three years.

Flores' desire to be better prepared in the field of acting led her to study acting in El Centro de Estudios Artísticos de Televisa (CEA). Her first acting opportunity came during a musical presentation in Tampico, where a producer offered her a role in the telenovela El combate, starring Ignacio López Tarso. Music was within her, and in 1980 Luis de Llano Macedo offered her the opportunity to sing and record some songs in English in the program Noche de Noche, hosted by Verónica Castro. In 1981 Laura starred in her first musical, Los Fantásticos. She later became the conductor of various special programs in which were portrayed during the early 1980s. In 1992, she recorded her first solo CD, Barcos de Papel, which made her carry out tours throughout all of the Mexican Republic.

In 1986, Laura married Uruguayan songwriter and singer Sergio Fachelli, who produced De Corazón a Corazón y Fruto Prohibido; but the relationship was cut short, ending in three years. She has participated in important telenovelas such as Los Años pasan, Clarisa, El vuelo del águila, Marisol, El Amor tiene cara de mujer, El alma no tiene color, Gotita de amor, and Siempre te amaré. In the year of 2005, after a temporary departure, she returned to the acting scene, starring in Piel de otoño.

In 1995, she sang some of her songs in a radio station event in the famous "Rancho Moreno" in Chino, California. At the 9th Lo Nuestro Awards, Flores received a nomination for Regional Mexican Female Singer of the Year. The following year, Flores was nominated for Pop Singer of the Year.

From 1995 to 1997, she hosted the Mexican version of Wheel of Fortune, La Rueda de la Fortuna.  The program aired on El Canal De Las Estrellas ("The Channel of the Stars.")

In 2006, she played a co-protagonist role in Mundo de Fieras with César Évora. The next year, she continues working as his wife in Al Diablo con los Guapos as a villain who later turns good.

In 2008, she left the program Hoy to give way for a telenovela En Nombre del Amor as Camila Ríos, the mother of the villain.

In 2009, she was part of the telenovela Corazón salvaje as Juan del Diablo's mother.

In fall 2010, she appeared on Mujeres Asesinas.

Since 2014, Flores is now working with Telemundo. She first played a special participation in En Otra Piel as Mónica Serrano, and later became part of the main cast of Reina de Corazones.

For her work in television and in the recording industry, Flores has had her handprints embedded at the Paseo de las Luminarias in Mexico City.

In 2019, she returns to Televisa thanks to the telenovela Juntos el corazón nunca se equivoca starring Emilio Osorio and Joaquín Bondoni, a telenovela where she plays the role of "Soledad de Ortega."

Filmography

Awards and nominations

Premios TVyNovelas

Premios lo Nuestro

Premios People en Español

Premios Tu Mundo

References

External links

Laura Flores at the telenovela database
Laura Flores at the esmas

1963 births
Living people
20th-century Mexican actresses
21st-century Mexican actresses
Mexican people of Spanish descent
Mexican child actresses
Mexican film actresses
Mexican telenovela actresses
Mexican television actresses
Actresses from Tamaulipas
Singers from Tamaulipas
People from Reynosa
Mexican Christians
20th-century Mexican women singers
Mexican women television presenters
Women in Latin music